Maritime London is a not for profit trade association for companies that provide professional services to the international shipping industry. The chief executive is Jos Standerwick. Maritime London runs a scholarship scheme, MLOCS, to allow young people to train to become Merchant Navy officers.

References

External links
http://www.maritimelondon.com/

Trade associations based in the United Kingdom
Organisations based in London
Shipping in England